The 2018 Challenger Banque Nationale de Granby was a professional tennis tournament played on outdoor hard courts. It was the twenty-fifth (ATP) and eighth (ITF) editions of the tournament and was part of the 2018 ATP Challenger Tour and the 2018 ITF Women's Circuit. It took place in Granby, Canada, on 23–29 July 2018.

Men's singles main draw entrants

Seeds

 1 Rankings are as of 16 July 2018.

Other entrants
The following players received wildcards into the singles main draw:
  Alexis Galarneau
  Pavel Krainik
  Samuel Monette
  Benjamin Sigouin

The following players received entry from the qualifying draw:
  Joris De Loore
  Dayne Kelly
  Lucas Miedler
  Wishaya Trongcharoenchaikul

The following players received entry as lucky losers:
  Takanyi Garanganga
  Jacob Grills

Women's singles main draw entrants

Seeds 

 1 Rankings as of 16 July 2018.

Other entrants 
The following players received a wildcard into the singles main draw:
  Isabelle Boulais 
  Jada Bui 
  Leylah Annie Fernandez 
  Tiffany Lagarde

The following players received entry from the qualifying draw:
  Freya Christie
  Nagi Hanatani
  Samantha Murray
  Akiko Omae

Champions

Men's singles

 Peter Polansky def.  Ugo Humbert 6–4, 1–6, 6–2

Women's singles

  Julia Glushko def.  Arina Rodionova 6–4, 6–3

Men's doubles

 Alex Lawson /  Li Zhe def.  JC Aragone /  Liam Broady 7–6(7–2), 6–3.

Women's doubles

 Ellen Perez /  Arina Rodionova def.  Erika Sema /  Aiko Yoshitomi, 7–5, 6–4

External links 
 2018 Challenger Banque Nationale de Granby at ITFtennis.com
 Official website

2018 ITF Women's Circuit
2018 ATP Challenger Tour
2018 in Canadian tennis
Challenger de Granby